Ringtown GAA is a Gaelic Athletic Association club located outside Castlepollard, County Westmeath, Ireland. The club is primarily concerned with the game of hurling.

History

Located outside Castlepollard, County Westmeath, Ringtwon Hurling Club was founded in 1902. The club has spent most of its existence operating at senior level, however, it currently participates in the intermediate grade. Ringtown won the first of its nine Westmeath SHC titles in 1906, with the last being claimed in 1987.

Honours

Westmeath Senior Hurling Championship (9): 1906, 1908, 1910, 1915, 1916, 1917, 1942, 1980, 1987
Westmeath Intermediate Hurling Championship (3): 1997, 2002, 2013

Notable players

 David Kilcoyne: All-Star-winner (1986)

References

Gaelic games clubs in County Westmeath
Hurling clubs in County Westmeath